Below is a list of newspapers published in Andorra. All newspapers in Andorra are written in the Catalan language

Daily 

Altaveu (Andorra la Vella)
 Bondia
Diari d'Andorra (Andorra la Vella)
El Periòdic d'Andorra / El Periòdic (Escaldes-Engordany)

Weekly 
7dies

See also
List of Catalan-language newspapers (includes newspapers in other Catalan-speaking areas that are outside Andorra)
List of newspapers

External links
 Altaveu
 Bondia
 Diari d'Andorra
 El Periòdic d'Andorra

Andorra
Newspapers